The Maritime Museum in Stockholm, Sweden is a museum for naval history, merchant shipping and shipbuilding. Located in the Gärdet section of the inner-city district Östermalm, the museum offers a panoramic view of the bay Djurgårdsbrunnsviken. The building was designed by architect Ragnar Östberg and built in 1933–36.

Collections 
The museum houses about 900,000 photos, 50,000 objects and 45,000 drawings, all related to the sea, coast, ships and boats, past and present. A major part of the collection, the boats, are housed in Boat Hall 2 at Galärvarvet in Stockholm. The boat collection ranges from canoes to Skerry cruisers.

On the bottom floor there are, among other things, exhibits on naval history including several detailed models of 18th century ships. The second floor includes exhibits on Swedish commercial fleets. In the basement is a replica of a cabin in King Gustav III's ship Amphion, along with the original stern from the ship.

Listing of historical ships 

The Maritime Museum is responsible for the listing of historical ships in Sweden. Both ships and pleasure boats of historical significance can be listed. While the listing offers no legal protection or obligations, it gives the owner of the craft certain privileges.

Architecture 
The gently curved building, inspired by the neoclassicist design of Olof Tempelman (1746–1816), acts as a background for the surrounding park where open-air concerts are held each year. It was the last major commission of Ragnar Östberg and was built on the location for the Stockholm Exhibition (1930) (Stockholmsutställningen 1930). As the exhibition was an important Functionalism manifestation, the museum also mark the point of view of the architect in the debate the introduction of Functionalist style caused in Sweden. The central cupola is entirely built of brick. The building also houses a model workshop, wood shop, photo studio, archives and a library. In the 1970s, a film and lecture hall was added and in the 1990s a café.

Outside of the museum is a bronze statue called The Sailor (Sjömannen), a memorial to the Swedish sailors who died during World War II. The statue was made by artist Nils Sjögren in 1952, just before he died. The statue was inaugurated in 1953.

Concerts 

Starting in 1975, open-air concerts and music festivals are held in the park in front of the museum. The annual concerts arranged by the newspaper Dagens Nyheter with the Royal Stockholm Philharmonic Orchestra are compared with, and inspired by, The Proms in the Royal Albert Hall. Among the other artists who have performed at events held at the museum are Oasis, Lisa Nilsson, Kent, Pearl Jam, Sarah Dawn Finer, Axwell, and Per Gessle.

Gallery

See also 
 List of museums in Stockholm

References

External links 

Pictures of ship models in the museum, from visit in June 2011 High resolution photos

Museums in Stockholm
National museums of Sweden
Maritime museums in Sweden
Military and war museums in Sweden
Museums established in 1938
1938 establishments in Sweden